The Second Sunder Lal Patwa ministry is the council of ministers in headed by Chief Minister Sunder Lal Patwa, which was formed after 1990 Madhya Pradesh Legislative Assembly election, where the BJP won 220 seats out of total 320 seats under his leadership. Sunder Lal Patwa the leader of the party in the assembly was sworn in as the Chief Minister of Madhya Pradesh on 5 March 1990. Here is the list of members of his ministry:

Council of Ministers

Cabinet Ministers

Ministers of  state

References 

1990 in Indian politics
Madhya Pradesh ministries
Bharatiya Janata Party state ministries
1990 establishments in Madhya Pradesh
Cabinets established in 1990
1992 disestablishments in India
Cabinets disestablished in 1992